Busy Beavers (also known as We Are Busy Beavers and stylized as BUSY BEAVERS) is an online children's educational program. It is aimed at parents and teachers of toddlers who speak English or are learning English as a second language, and parents of children with a learning disability, autism or delayed speech.
The Busy Beavers YouTube channel and website provide interactive media to help teach children. Their YouTube channel has over 2 billion views, and over 2 million subscribers with Billy Beaver and Betty Beaver.

History
In 2004, Dave Martin created Busy Beavers as a company that produces children's educational videos on DVDs.
In March 2007, he launched a YouTube channel called Busy Beavers TV that gives the subscribers all of Busy Beavers' existing videos ad-free and in high definition.

In 2015, Busy Beavers joined the Channel Frederator Network and is by views the number one channel of the multi-channel network.

In April 2016, Busy Beavers and Baby Beavers have both been added to Roku, and Kidoodle.TV in September 2016.

They have also created an app for iOS called Busy Beavers Jukebox.

See also 
 Beaver

References 

Educational organizations
YouTube channels